Steve Clemente (born Esteban Clemento Morro November 22, 1885 – May 7, 1950) was a Mexican-American actor known for his many villainous roles. He began acting in his teens, signing up for his first movie, The Secret Man, in 1917. His later roles were usually bit parts.

In 1922, he came to Hollywood to put on a knife demonstration for a disbelieving director. He was trusted to throw knives in movies that had to land an inch or two away from a celebrity. He always got right on target, and developed a good reputation for stunts. He was a known scene stealer and was famous for his villainous snarl. He later appeared in such movies as The Most Dangerous Game (1932), playing Tartar, the second henchman of Count Zarrof and played the Witch King in King Kong (1933) and its sequel Son of Kong (1933).

After his last movie, Perils of Nyoka (1942), he retired from the acting scene. On May 7, 1950, he died from a cerebral hemorrhage.

Filmography

Actor

 The Secret Man (1917) .... Pedro, the Foreman (as Steve Clement)
 The Law of Nature (1917) (as Stebeno Clements)
 The Scarlet Drop (1918) .... Buck (as Steve Clemento)
 Hell Bent (1918) .... Undetermined Role
 Lightning Bryce (1919) .... Zambleau
 The Arizona Cat Claw (1919) .... Zappatti (as Steve Clemento)
 The Girl Who Dared (1920) .... Ramez (as Steve Clemento)
 Thunderbolt Jack (1920) .... Manuel Garcia (as Steve Clemento)
 Cyclone Bliss (1921) .... Pedro (as Steve Clemento)
 Outlawed (1921) .... Frank Kayner (as Steve Clemento)
 Sure Fire (1921) .... Gomez (as Steve Clements)
 The Double O (1921) .... Cholo Pete (as Steve Clemento)
 Two-Fisted Jefferson (1922) (as Steve Clements)
 The Forbidden Trail (1923) .... Uncle Mose (as Steve Clemento)
 Crashin' Through (1924) .... Pedro (as Steve Clements)
 Fast and Fearless (1924) .... Gonzales (as Steve Clemento)
 Trigger Fingers (1924) .... Mexican Henchman (uncredited)
 The Rainbow Trail (1925) .... Nas Ta Bega
 Riding Romance (1925) .... Morgan Henchman (as Steve Clements)
 Chip of the Flying U (1926) .... Indian (as Steve Clemento)
 The Combat (1926) .... Halfbreed (as Steve Clemento)
 Davy Crockett at the Fall of the Alamo (1926) .... Mose (as Steve Clemento)
 The Temptress (1926) .... Salvadore (uncredited)
 The Sideshow (1928) .... Knife thrower (as Steve Clemento)
 The Rescue (1929) .... Islander (uncredited)
 Wings of Adventure (1930) .... Bandit (uncredited)
 Lariats and Sixshooters (1931) .... Saloon Mexican (uncredited)
 The Lightning Warrior (1931) .... Henchman (uncredited) 
 Forty-Five Calibre Echo (1932) .... Mexican in saloon (uncredited)
 Riders of the Desert (1932) .... Henchman Lobos (uncredited)
 Mystery Ranch (1932) .... Henchman Steve (uncredited)
 Guns for Hire (1932) .... 'Flash' Gomez
 The Most Dangerous Game (1932) .... Tartar (as Steve Clemento)
 The Golden West (1932) .... Interrogated Indian (uncredited)
 Tex Takes a Holiday (1932) .... Knife-tossing Henchman
 Clancy of the Mounted (1933) .... Patouche - Renegade Indian
 King Kong (1933) .... Native Witch King (as Steve Clemento)
 The Gallant Fool (1933) .... Circus Knife Thrower (uncredited)
 King of the Arena (1933) .... Henchman Pedro (uncredited)
 The Son of Kong (1933) .... Native Witch King (uncredited)
 The Fighting Ranger (1934) .... Cougar's Mexican Henchman (uncredited)
 Viva Villa! (1934) .... Member of Pascal's staff (uncredited)
 The Murder in the Museum (1934) .... Pedro Darro
 Range Riders (1934) .... Saloon Swamper (uncredited)
 Fighting Through (1934) .... Steve - the Knife Thrower 
 Kid Millions (1934) .... Desert rider (uncredited)
 Five Bad Men (1935) .... Rodriguez
 Under Two Flags (1936) .... Knife Thrower (uncredited)
 White Fang (1936) .... Indian (uncredited)
 The Vigilantes Are Coming (1936) .... Pedro, Burr's Spanish Henchman [Chs. 1-6]
 The Sunday Round-Up (1936) .... Knife Thrower
 Phantom of Santa Fe (1936) .... A Vaquero (uncredited)
 Land Beyond the Law (1937) .... Indian (uncredited)
 Hills of Old Wyoming (1937) .... Lone Eagle
 It Happened Out West (1937) .... Pedro
 Hawaiian Buckaroo (1938) .... Henchman (uncredited)
 The Cowboy and the Lady (1938) .... Knife Thrower (uncredited)
 Arrest Bulldog Drummond (1938) .... Native Buying Rifle (uncredited) 
 Stagecoach (1939) .... Bit (uncredited)
 Mad Youth (1940) .... Knife-Thrower in Club Act (uncredited)
 Adventures of Captain Marvel (1941) .... Native 5 (uncredited)
 Sing Your Worries Away (1942) .... Knife Thrower (uncredited)
 Perils of Nyoka (1942) .... Tuareg (uncredited)
 Hangmen Also Die! (1943) .... Knife Thrower (uncredited)
 Murder on the Waterfront (1943) .... 'The Great Rajah' throwing knives (final film role)

Miscellaneous Crew
 Under Two Flags (1936) .... knife thrower (uncredited)
 Valley of the Sun (1942) .... knife thrower (uncredited)
 Rookies in Burma (1943) .... knife thrower
 Murder on the Waterfront (1943) ....  knife thrower (uncredited)

Stuntman
 The Big Trail (1930) (uncredited)

External links
 

1885 births
1950 deaths
Mexican male film actors
American male film actors
American male actors of Mexican descent
Mexican male silent film actors
American male silent film actors
20th-century American male actors
20th-century Mexican male actors
Male Western (genre) film actors
RKO Pictures contract players
Mexican emigrants to the United States